"When I Think of You" is the third single released from ex-Blue member Lee Ryan's debut solo album, Lee Ryan. The song peaked at number 15 on the UK Singles Chart.

Track listing
 UK CD single (82876 78289 2)
 "When I Think Of You" - 3:05
 "I Can Let Go Now" - 3:24

Charts

References

2005 songs
2006 singles
Lee Ryan songs
Sony BMG singles